Heinz Lammerding (27 August 1905 – 13 January 1971) was a German SS officer convicted of war crimes during the Nazi era. During World War II, he commanded the SS Panzer Division Das Reich that perpetrated the Tulle and the Oradour-sur-Glane massacres in occupied France. After the war, Lammerding was convicted in absentia for having ordered the murder of approximately 750 French civilians, but remained protected by Germany after serving a prison sentence there.

War-crimes trial
In 1953, Lammerding was tried in France for war crimes, for ordering two massacres in 1944: at Tulle and at Oradour-sur-Glane. He was sentenced to death in absentia by the court of Bordeaux, but he was never extradited from West Germany nor was he ever sentenced by a German court.  According to Danny S. Parker, Lammerding had already been tried in West Germany, convicted of war crimes and had served a prison sentence. He, therefore, was not subject to extradition under the Bonn constitution, much to the consternation of the French. They threatened to send in a commando unit to seize him, as the Israelis did in the case of Adolf Eichmann. However, before this could occur, Lammerding died in 1971 from cancer.

Funeral 
His funeral in 1971 turned into a reunion of over 200 former SS personnel.

Awards 
 German Cross in Gold on 24 April 1943 as SS-Standartenführer and commander of SS-Regiment "Thule"
 Knight's Cross of the Iron Cross on 11 April 1944 as SS-Oberführer and commander of Kampfgruppe "Das Reich"

References

Citations

Bibliography

 
 
 

1905 births
1971 deaths
German mass murderers
Military personnel from Dortmund
People from the Province of Westphalia
Recipients of the Gold German Cross
Recipients of the Knight's Cross of the Iron Cross
SS-Brigadeführer
Nazis convicted of war crimes
Nazis sentenced to death in absentia
Waffen-SS personnel
Deaths from cancer in Germany